Navesti Landscape Conservation Area is a nature park which is located in Viljandi County, Estonia.

The area of the nature park is 169 ha.

The protected area was founded in 1992 to protect the dunes of Navesti valley.

References

Nature reserves in Estonia
Geography of Viljandi County